Eli Robins (1921 Texas – 1994 Washington) was an American psychiatrist who played a pivotal role in establishing the way mental disorders are researched and diagnosed today.

Early career
Robins finished his medical training and residencies at Harvard, where he worked under biologically-oriented psychiatrist Mandel E. Cohen who would greatly influence his career and with whom he first developed ideas about operational definitions for psychiatric conditions (the theory of operationalization having been recently advanced by Harvard physicist and philosopher of science Percy Williams Bridgman). Robins rejected the then dominant psychoanalysis, having personally undergone it for a year as was the norm in training, describing it as 'silly' (he also had a relative who committed suicide at Harvard-affiliated McLean Hospital while being treated with psychoanalytic methods).

Move to St. Louis
Robins moved to the psychiatric department at Washington University in St. Louis in 1949, initially as a pharmacology fellow working in the lab of biochemist Oliver H. Lowry, author of the most cited scientific paper ever (on a method for measuring proteins).

Throughout his career he published on brain neurochemistry and histology. He would be author on more than 175 peer-reviewed articles, including on suicide, hysteria, homosexuality and depression.

In 1956/57 he conducted a large-scale community-based study of suicides in St Louis which involved detailed structured interviews with people who had been in regular contact with the person beforehand. This has been noted as the first completed example of a practice that was shortly thereafter termed psychological autopsy by researchers in Los Angeles (coiner Edwin S. Shneidman).

Robins became department head in 1963, despite having early signs of what would later be diagnosed as probable multiple sclerosis. He was married to Lee Robins, a sociologist associate of psychiatry at Washington.

Developing diagnostic criteria
Robins formed a close working trio with Samuel Guze and George Winokur, and from the late 1950s they developed criteria sets for a 'medical model of psychiatric disorders' Influential psychiatrist Gerald Klerman approvingly dubbed the approach "neo-Kraepelinian" in 1978. The trio were influenced by the classification system and diagnostic principles of German psychiatrist Emil Kraepelin, and more recently by a textbook Clinical Psychiatry by British psychiatrists, principally Willy Mayer-Gross who had previously worked in Germany at the same institute as Kraepelin.

Led by Robins, the trio published with several others in 1972 the so-called Feighner Criteria (named after the then junior psychiatrist John Feighner who was lead author on the paper, which would become the most cited in psychiatry). This led through into the Research Diagnostic Criteria developed with Robert Spitzer and others, which ultimately shaped the influential third edition of the Diagnostic and Statistical Manual of Mental Disorders published by the American Psychiatric Association. His wife Lee was also involved in the developments.

References

1921 births
1994 deaths
American psychiatrists
20th-century American physicians
Harvard Medical School alumni
Washington University in St. Louis fellows
Washington University School of Medicine faculty